The Battle of El Memiso, was the third major battle of the Dominican War of Independence and was fought on the 13 April 1844, at El Memiso, Azua Province. A force of Dominican troops, a portion of the Army of the South, led by General Antonio Duvergé, defeated an outnumbering force of the Haitian Army led by Col. Pierre Paul.

Notes

References
 

El Memiso
El Memiso
El Memiso
1844 in the Dominican Republic
April 1844 events